Wes Heffernan (born 7 March 1977) is a Canadian professional golfer.

Heffernan was born in Calgary, Alberta and attended Mount Royal College and the University of Calgary.

During his time at Mount Royal College, Heffernan dominated golf in Western Canada. He racked up four wins in six tournaments between 1997 and 1998. In September 1997 he, along with teammate Scott Baird, led the Cougars to a 26-shot, team victory in the Alberta Colleges Athletics Conference Championship. Heffernan won the silver medal finishing just behind Baird. Later that fall, he put together one of his finest efforts as a Cougar, leading Mount Royal to a Western Canadian Championship at the Kamloops Golf and Country Club. He also won the individual tournament. Heffernan won his next three starts in early 1998, defeating some stiff competition from schools in the United States. In each of his three individual wins, he led Mount Royal to the overall team title each time.

He won the 2000 Alberta Amateur Championship a year after he finished runner-up in the Canadian Amateur Championship. He turned professional in 2000.

His first victory on the Canadian Tour came in 2006 at the Casino de Montreal Open for the Players Championship and he would add three more wins after that between 2007 and 2008.

Heffernan won the Alberta Open in 2006, 2007, 2008, 2011, 2012 and 2018.

Heffernan has played in two major championships on the PGA Tour, the 2001 and 2011 U.S. Opens. In 2011, Heffernan's back nine in the second round of 5 under par (31) allowed him to make his first cut in a major.

Heffernan won the 100th playing of the BetRegal PGA Championship of Canada in June 2022 at Beacon Hall Golf Club in Aurora, Ontario.

Amateur wins
2000 Alberta Amateur Championship

Professional wins (12)

Canadian Tour wins (4)

Other wins (8)
2006 Alberta Open
2007 Alberta Open
2008 Alberta Open
2011 Alberta Open
2012 Alberta Open
2018 Alberta Open
2019 PGA Assistants' Championship of Canada
2022 PGA Championship of Canada

Results in major championships

CUT = missed the half-way cut

Team appearances
Amateur
Eisenhower Trophy (representing Canada): 2000

Professional
World Cup (representing Canada): 2007, 2008

External links

Canadian male golfers
Golfing people from Alberta
Sportspeople from Calgary
1977 births
Living people